State Highway 67 (SH-67) is a state highway in Elmore County, Idaho. It connects the Mountain Home Air Force Base to SH-51 in the city of Mountain Home.

Route description

SH-67 begins at the main entrance of the Mountain Home Air Force Base, located in southwestern Elmore County. The five-lane highway, named Airbase Road, travels due north from the base entrance to a junction with Grand View Road (signed as SH-167). From the junction, SH-67 turns northeast and travels through a section of the Morley Nelson Snake River Birds of Prey National Conservation Area in the barren outskirts of Mountain Home as a four-lane, undivided highway. The highway then enters the city of Mountain Home and turns east before passing a municipal airport. Except for a brief divided section at the intersection with SH-167, the entire highway is four-lane non-divided, with center lane-left turn only areas where needed.

History
The history of SH-67 goes back to at least the 1930s, when the first all-weather gravel road connecting Grand View and Mountain Home was built (represented by today's SH-167, SH-67 and SH-51), and can be seen on a 1937 map of the area.  A road from this road to the site of the base has existed since at least November 1942, when base construction began.

The route received its current number designation in the late 1960s in honor of the base's then-host unit, the 67th Tactical Reconnaissance Wing (1965-1971).

In order to improve the base's prospects to remain open during a round of base closures in the 1970s, Idaho's legislature voted to expand the highway to the base to four lanes, although it was an area noted for gusty winds and tumbling tumbleweeds and little else. The expansion project also realigned the highway to go directly to the base's main gate.  The unexpanded two-lane section of SH-67 that passed to the west of the base was delisted and unsigned (even though it was still officially maintained by ITD for the Simplot feed lot and the base's recreation area at C. J. Strike Dam just north of the Snake River) prior to its redesignation as SH-167.

Major intersections

See also

 List of state highways in Idaho

References

External links

067
Transportation in Elmore County, Idaho